Modern medical education in Hong Kong started with the founding of the Hong Kong College of Medicine for Chinese  in 1887. Currently, six institutes of higher education are engaged in the training of medical practitioners in Hong Kong.

History

The Hong Kong College of Medicine for Chinese was founded in 1887 by the London Missionary Society, with its first graduate (in 1892) being Sun Yat-sen. Sun following the 1911 Xinhai Revolution, which changed China from an empire to a republic, became president of China. The Hong Kong College of Medicine for Chinese was the forerunner of the School of Medicine of the University of Hong Kong, which started in 1911.

Medical and Healthcare Education Institutes

The intakes of various healthcare related Bachelor's programs in Hong Kong are limited.

Hong Kong has only two comprehensive medical faculties, the Li Ka Shing Faculty of Medicine, University of Hong Kong and the Faculty of Medicine, Chinese University of Hong Kong, and they are also the sole two institutes offering pharmacy and six-year medical programmes. Both universities' medical programmes are composed of two parts, two to three years of pre-clinical studies (duration depends on whether the student is a high school graduate or a degree holder pursuing for another degree), and three years of clinical years. Throughout the three years of clinical clerkship, students are rotated in general medicine, surgery, and other specialties. In order to better address Hong Kong's healthcare needs, there have been calls for the creation of a third medical school in Hong Kong.

Other healthcare discipline programmes are dispersed among other universities which do not host a medical faculty.

Various postgraduate courses in different fields of healthcare or biomedical sciences are also provided by those institutes.

In addition to Bachelor program, some education bodies, public hospitals and private hospitals were acknowledged as registered nurse/ enrolled nurse training schools by The Nursing Council of Hong Kong to provide higher diploma programs or professional diploma programs, in order to increase manpower of Enrolled Nurses and Registered Nurses in the industry.

Internship
To be registered as medical practitioners, medical graduates must successfully undertake and complete at least one year of supervised practice, generally known as an internship, with satisfactory performance. The internship is undertaken in hospital positions accredited for this purpose.

During this year interns (house officers) are rotated to four specialties (medicine and surgery plus two of obstetrics and gynaecology, paediatrics, orthopaedics and traumatology, emergency medicine, psychiatry or ophthalmology). Each of them lasts three months. There is no work hour limit in Hong Kong and interns are expected to work 80–100 hours per week.

Non-local Medical Graduates

Before the handover in 1997, medical degrees from HKU and CUHK were eligible for full registration with the General Medical Council in the United Kingdom. However, reciprocality for UK/ Commonwealth medical graduates has since been abolished. In order to become a fully registered medical practitioner in Hong Kong, all non-local medial graduates are required to attain a medical license (LMCHK) from the Medical Council of Hong Kong. The rigorous process includes passing the 3-part Licentiate Examination (HKMLE). In 2017, the Licentiate Society, an independent, non-profit entity, formed to represent the LMCHK and to help meet their professional needs. The MCHK exempts graduates of HKU and CUHK from taking the HKMLE.

Residency

After successful completion of medical school, graduates are awarded a provisional registration for their internship year (i.e. the first year of residency). Internship is guaranteed for HKU and CUHK medical graduates and for non-local graduates that have passed the Licentiate Examination. Upon successful completion of the intern year (PGY1), medical graduates are awarded a full registration, and can practice as general practitioners in either the public or private sector. Many, however, choose to pursue specialist training within the Hospital Authority, and enter into a four to six year program, after which they will have attained a specialist registration. Unlike those in the UK or North America, numerous residency programs in Hong Kong remain unfilled after the annual match process, with up to fifty unfilled training posts every year.

Specialist training
Specialist training is only offered at hospitals under the Hospital Authority of Hong Kong. A trainee has to undergo one year of pre-registration internship and four to six years of supervised specialist training and pass in the exit examination or assessment held by Hong Kong Academy of Medicine. Passing the exit examination or assessment is a prerequisite to Fellowship of the Academy. The examinations are all conjoint with the British and Australian royal colleges, e.g. Royal College of Physicians, Australian and New Zealand College of Anaesthetists. For example, a Hong Kong trained general surgeon in Hong Kong will be eligible for FCSHK, FHKAM (General Surgery), FRCS (General Surgery) and FRCS (Edinburgh) while a radiologist will expect to obtain FHKCR, FHKAM (Radiology) and FRCR at the end of their fellowship training. The FHKAM examination focuses on local pathology and also incorporates other components, e.g. logbook evaluation, literature appraisal, teaching, research and annual viva voce that are not included by the Royal College examinations. The pass rate of the FHKAM is similar to that of the Royal College exams, viz.  20-60% depending on specialty.

Promotion to a further post, e.g. Associate Consultant, often depends on availability of posts: it is primarily dependent on whether a senior consultant has left for private practice, leaving a vacancy. The salary cap, at the resident level (i.e. Medical Officer), is currently limited to $152,356 HKD per month (at 2016/17 levels). This is exclusive of a 5% housing allowance, and up to 15% gratuity annually, to be released every three years. This has generated an exodus of specialists from the HA to the private sector, and the HA has responded by pledging to promote all specialists to Associate Consultants within 5 years of obtaining specialist qualification. However, this is not a permanent policy and is subject to the government budget. Before the new policy, it was not unusual to see public doctors remaining as 'Medical Officers' more than 10 years after obtaining their specialist qualifications. (1)

Family medicine is recognized as a major specialty in Hong Kong. Specialists in family medicine have undertaken at least six years of accredited training, and earned internationally renowned postgraduate medical qualifications as well as Fellowship of The Hong Kong Academy of Medicine just as their counterparts in hospital medicine or other medical fields.

Continuing medical education

Continuing medical education for specialists 
A registered practitioner who wishes to have his/her name included in the Specialist Register of the Medical Council of Hong Kong is required to satisfy the continuing medical education (CME) requirements as stipulated by the Medical Registration Ordinance (Cap 161).

The objective of the CME is to 
 maintain, develop or increase the knowledge, skills and competencies relevant to the practice of specialists that may change over the years;
 enhance professional performance to enable the delivery of quality professional care and safe standard of practice to the patients, and public that specialists serve, and;
 ensure that specialists will remain competent throughout their professional career.

The Hong Kong Academy of Medicine requires each specialist to attain a minimum CME requirement of 90 points in a 3-year cycle. A point is equivalent to 1 hour of participation in CME activities. To encourage active learning elements and a balanced mix of different activities, the Academy limits the passive CME points (i.e. points obtained through attending lectures or talks) to 75 points maximum per cycle. Each college of the Academy may recommend additional requirements.

Continuing medical education for non-specialists 
The Medical Council of Hong Kong has also implemented a CME programme for practising doctors who are not taking CME for specialists. Enrolment to the programme is on a voluntary basis. The purpose of the programme is to encourage practising doctors to keep themselves up-to-date on current developments in medical practice so as to maintain a high professional standard.

Practising doctors who have accumulated the required minimum credit points per year, i.e. 30 credit points, will be awarded a certificate to certify that they have achieved a satisfactory level of CME activity during a particular period. Such a certificate can be displayed inside the doctor's office. In addition, those practising doctors who have accumulated the required minimum credit points during a three-year cycle, i.e. 90 credit points, will be allowed to use the title "CME certified" on their visiting cards.

Graduate Entry Medicine
The two medical schools in Hong Kong do not offer such programs and postgraduates have to undergo the same program as high school graduates. Despite that, postgraduates are increasing in number in local medical schools, now amounting to one fourth of the entire student population. However, graduate entry students may be permitted to enter into the second year of medical school based on their previous major.

Career structure in the Hospital Authority

See also
Li Ka Shing Faculty of Medicine
Faculties of Medicines in Hong Kong

References

External links 

School of Medicine, Hong Kong University
Hong Kong Academy of Medicine
CUHK MBChB Programme - Course Description
The Medical Licentiate Society of Hong Kong

 
Education in Hong Kong